Nazia Raheel (born 25 January 1974) is a Pakistani politician who had been a Member of the Provincial Assembly of the Punjab, from 2008 to May 2018.

Early life and education
Raheel was born on 25 January 1974 in Abbottabad.

She holds a degree of Bachelor of Arts and completed her graduation in Law and Political Science from Army Burn Hall College in 1995.

Political career

She ran for the seat of the Provincial Assembly of the Punjab as a candidate for Pakistan Muslim League (Q) (PML-Q) for Constituency PP-88 (Toba Tek Singh-V) in 2002 Pakistani general election but was unsuccessful. She received 21,623 votes and lost the seat to an independent candidate, Ashifa Riaz Fatyana.

She was elected to the Provincial Assembly of the Punjab as a candidate for Pakistan Muslim League (N) (PML-N) for Constituency PP-88 (Toba Tek Singh-V) in 2008 Pakistani general election. She received 23,550 votes and defeated Ashifa Riaz Fatyana, a candidate of PML-Q.

She was re-elected to the Provincial Assembly of the Punjab as a candidate for PML-N for Constituency PP-88 (Toba Tek Singh-V) in 2013 Pakistani general election. She received 37,216 votes and defeated an independent candidate, Ashifa Riaz Fatyana.

References

Living people
Women members of the Provincial Assembly of the Punjab
Punjab MPAs 2013–2018
Punjab MPAs 2008–2013
1974 births
Pakistan Muslim League (N) MPAs (Punjab)
21st-century Pakistani women politicians